Gopalakrishna Bharathi (1810–1896) was a Tamil poet and a composer of Carnatic music. He composed the Kathakalakshepam Nandanar Charitram, two other works in this genre, and many independent kritis.

Bharathi was a contemporary of Thyagaraja whom he is said to have met, and who asked him whether he had composed anything in the raga AbhOgi; Bharathi composed overnight one of his most popular kritis in rUpaka tALa, Sabhaapatikku vERu. The great Tamil literary figure, U. V. Swaminatha Iyer wrote two sources for Bhaarati's life: a biography of the composer and his own autobiography, which contains references to Bharathi, who was his guru in music.

Early life

Gopalakrishna Bharathi was born at Narimanam, near Nagapattinam. He spent his early days in Mudikondan, near Thiruvarur. A few years later he moved to Anandathandavapuram village, near Mayavaram where he lived almost his entire life. His father, grandfather, and great-grandfather were all veena exponents and scholars in Sanskrit. After losing his parents at an early age, he worked as a cook in a temple. He then met Govinda Yati, who taught him Hindu scripture, and then the musician Ramdas, who taught him Hindustani music. Gopalakrishna started his professional career after finding a patron named Annu Iyer.

Compositions

Gopalakrishna Bharathi composed several kritis on the principles of advaita. Gopalakrishna Bharathi's kritis, portraying several musical facades, were extremely well received by the public and were sung in a number of concerts during his lifetime. This prompted several musicians to approach Gopalakrishna Bharathi. The musicians would express his vision for a new kirtana and Bharathi would always oblige and compose a song to fit the musician's requirement.

The Nandanar Caritram is a Kathakalakshepam, a genre of religious story-telling with music that was popular in Tamil Nadu in the 19th and early 20th centuries before the advent of film, especially the talkies. Nandan Caritiram was based on the story of a paraiyAr (dalit or 'untouchable'), Nandanar known also as TirunAlaippOvAr NayanAr. A great devotee of Siva, he yearned to visit Chidambaram the greatest of Siva temples. He greatly feared that caste prejudice would prevent him from entering the temple, but his devotion overcame this obstacle, and he obtained his desire, becoming physically merged with Siva in a blaze of light. Bharati's version of NantanAr Carittiram is a masterly development of the story narrated in Sekkizhar's Periya Puranam. He included many forms of Tamil regional music and is praised for his ability to capture dialect and popular expression. The eminent Tamil literary scholar, Meenakshisundaram Pillai, however, criticised him for deviating from historical facts of the story, and for grammatical lapses.

Gopalakrishna Bharati used the mudra (signature) Gopalakrishna in his compositions. These include famous kritis like Varukalamo (raga manji), Varuvaro (sama) and Enneramam (raga Devagandhari).

Performance history

Nandan Caritiram, as performed by Bharathi, proved very popular and he published it in his lifetime. The highly regarded Thanjavur Krishna Bhagavatar, who developed the art of kathakalakshepam by introducing elements from Marathi performance practice and elements of dance, made it one of his masterpieces. Many adaptations appeared, including stage plays and three film versions. Individual songs of Gopalakrishna Bharathi became popular with Carnatic musicians. Later, Bharata Natyam dancers, including T. Balasaraswati, took up select pieces for interpretation as abhinaya. The album of the film version starring the singer M. M. Dandapani Desikar as Nandanar (with music direction by Papanasam Sivan) remains popular.

The story of Nandanar, as Bharati developed it, had considerable resonance with the Nationalist movement in India. Nandanar was an untouchable (dalit), and M. K. Gandhi, among others, saw his story as expressing the plight and aspirations of India's dalits. Others argue that Nandanar, with his burning desire to see Shiva at Chidambaram, captured the mood and paralleled the aspirations of Indian nationalists yearning for independence from Britain.

Publication
Bharati's kathakalakshepams were so popular in Karaikal that several government officials would sleep at work after spending the whole night listening to his performances. Karaikal was then a French colony and the official Cisse decided to conduct an inquiry into the reason behind the inefficiency of his employees. His investigations led him to conclude that the cause was in fact Bharathi. Curious, he decided to pay a visit personally to one of Bharathi's concerts. Cisse was so impressed by Bharathi's performance that he decided to help him publish his work as a book. This eventually led to the publication of Nandan Caritiram, one of Bharati's most popular works.

See also
List of Carnatic composers

References & Audio Links

External links
 Carnatica.net
 Carnatic Music Krithi Audio Archive: http://www.ecse.rpi.edu/Homepages/shivkuma/music/index.html 
 Carnatic music notation for few Tamil, Telugu, English songs at VK's website: http://www.keylessonline.com/
 Palem Gopalakrishna Carnatic music section with notations for Telugu songs: http://gopalakrishna.palem.in/music.html
 CFugue C++ API for Carnatic Music Programming: http://gopalakrishna.palem.in/CFugue.html
 CarMusTy Carnatic Music Typesetting Environment: http://gopalakrishna.palem.in/CarMusTy.html
 Carnatic music notation page links at Musically Urs's website: http://www.angelfire.com/musicals/musically_urs/notation_link.html

Carnatic composers
1811 births
1896 deaths
People from Nagapattinam district
19th-century classical composers